People in the Sun is a 2011 Norwegian comedy film directed by Per-Olav Sørensen.

Cast
Kjersti Holmen as Siv
Ingar Helge Gimle as Svein
Ane Dahl Torp as Ingrid
Jon Øigarden as Stig
Ghita Nørby as Fru Sørensen

References

External links

2011 comedy films
2011 films
Norwegian comedy films